Ischnochiton smaragdinus is a species of chiton in the family Ischnochitonidae.

Description

Distribution
This species is endemic to southeastern and southwestern Australia (New South Wales, South Australia, Tasmania, Western Australia).

Habitat
These chitons live intertidally and subtidally under rocks and stones.

References

Ischnochitonidae
Molluscs described in 1867